Charles Alfred Howell  (22 October 1905 – 26 October 1974) was a Labour Party politician in the United Kingdom.  He was elected Member of Parliament for Birmingham Perry Barr at the 1955 general election, and served until the 1964 general election when the seat was gained against the national trend by the Conservative candidate Wyndham Davies.

References

External links 
 

1905 births
1974 deaths
Labour Party (UK) MPs for English constituencies
National Union of Railwaymen-sponsored MPs
Officers of the Order of the British Empire
UK MPs 1955–1959
UK MPs 1959–1964